Ariadne taeniata  is a species of biblidine butterfly endemic to the Philippines

Subspecies
A. t. taeniata (northern Philippines)
A. t. adelpha (C. & R. Felder, 1861) (Philippines)

References

Biblidinae
Butterflies described in 1861
Butterflies of Asia
Taxa named by Baron Cajetan von Felder
Taxa named by Rudolf Felder